Kharisa is a census town in Kolaghat CD block in Tamluk subdivision of Purba Medinipur district in the state of West Bengal, India.

Geography

Location

Urbanisation
94.08% of the population of Tamluk subdivision live in the rural areas. Only 5.92% of the population live in the urban areas, and that is the second lowest proportion of urban population amongst the four subdivisions in Purba Medinipur district, just above Egra subdivision.

Note: The map alongside presents some of the notable locations in the subdivision. All places marked in the map are linked in the larger full screen map.

Demographics
As per 2011 Census of India Kharisa had a total population of 4,120 of which 2,088 (51%) were males and 2,032 (49%) were females. Population below 6 years was 344. The total number of literates in Kharisa was 3,437 (91.02% of the population over 6 years).

Infrastructure
As per the District Census Handbook 2011, Kharisha covered an area of 1.3116 km2. It had the facility of a railway station at Mecheda 1.5 km away and bus route in the town. Amongst the civic amenities it had 37 road lighting points and 431 domestic electric connections. Amongst the medical facilities it had a hospital with 30 beds nearby and 8 medicine shops in the town. Amongst the educational facilities it had were 2 primary schools, 1 middle school, 1 secondary school and 1 senior secondary school in the town. The nearest degree college was at Tamluk 15 km away. Amongst the recreational and cultural facilities a cinema theatre and auditorium/ community hall were there at Mecheda 1.5 km away and a public library and a reading room in the town.

Transport
A short stretch of local roads links Kharisha to National Highway 16 (Kolkata-Chennai Highway, with links to the highway leading to Mumbai).

References

Cities and towns in Purba Medinipur district